WFSU may refer to:

 WFSU-TV, a television station (channel 11 analog/32 digital) licensed to Tallahassee, Florida, United States
 WFSU-FM, a radio station (88.9 FM) licensed to Tallahassee, Florida, United States